The Praya Reclamation Scheme was a large scale land reclamation project carried out by the Hong Kong Land company in Colonial Hong Kong under Sir Catchick Paul Chater and James Johnstone Keswick.

Early proposal
The project was first proposed in 1855 but many merchants with private piers on the waterfront objected to the scheme.

The first reclamation project eventually began in 1868 and was completed in 1873. It added significant land to Praya Central, which later became present-day Des Voeux Road.

Second reclamation scheme
The second project was revived by the Tai-pan of The Hong Kong and Kowloon Wharf and Godown Company in July 1887. It did not commence until February 1890,  and as it was significantly larger than the first, the completion was between 1903 and 1904.  There were discrepancies in the number of acres actually gained from the entire project: some sources claimed it added  of land to Hong Kong's Central waterfront and Statue Square, while some indicated that the total area was extended by  using materials with a total weight of 3.5 million tons.

See also
 The Hongs
 Land reclamation in Hong Kong
 Praya East Reclamation Scheme
 Prince's Building

References

Coastal construction in Hong Kong
Land reclamation